Five Cranky Brothers is a television program that airs on JTBC. It aired every Thursday at 23:00 (KST), starting from October 31, 2019. The show finished airing on February 6, 2020.

A pilot episode was aired on September 12, 2019, as a special program for Chuseok.

Overview
A variety talk show where the five Brothers discuss and rank, in order, anything from our daily lives.

Format
Current
 Cranky Viewer's Request: Viewers can send in questions and options through the show's official website, and the Brothers would answer the selected questions by experimenting the options to rank them.
 Cranky Sorting: The Brothers would discuss and rank a topic with the given options provided from first to fifth. Battles of this segment with the guest sisters could also be held, where they have to guess the rankings of the given options from the topic to match the rankings based on a group of people (of varying demographics) that have been surveyed with the same question and the same given options. 
 Cranky Neighbourhood Battle: The Brothers work together to battle with opponents from outside the Cranky House.

Former

 The Brothers would discuss and rank a topic with the given options provided. A Surprise Event is then held, and the Brothers have to guess the rankings of the given options from the previous question to match the rankings based on people that have been surveyed with the same question and the same given options. If the Brothers can get the Surprise Event question correctly guessed, they can get to eat food.
 A real life question/scenario is given by the Sisters and the Brothers each think of an answer/solution of their own (or can have the same answer when options are given). The Sisters will then rank the answers/solutions from first to fifth, with the best possible answer/solution for the Sisters ranked first and the remaining four Brothers would get hit by water from water cannons.
 Cranky Brothers' Test: 3 questions (related to the Brothers) are prepared and whoever gets all 3 correct would not get hit by the water from water cannons.

Cast

Regular
 Park Joon-hyung (g.o.d) - Eldest brother
 Seo Jang-hoon - 2nd brother 
 Kim Jong-kook - 3rd brother
 Lee Jin-hyuk (UP10TION) - 4th brother
 Seungkwan (Seventeen) - Youngest brother

Pilot
 Park Joon-hyung (g.o.d) - Eldest brother
 Seo Jang-hoon - 2nd brother 
 Kim Jong-kook - 3rd brother
 Joo Woo-jae - 4th brother 
 Baekhyun (EXO) - Youngest brother

Episodes

2019

2020

Ratings 
In the ratings below, the highest rating for the show will be in red, and the lowest rating for the show will be in blue each year. Some of the ratings found have already been rounded off to 1 decimal place, as they are usually of lower rankings in terms of the day's ratings.

2019

2020

Notes

References

External links

South Korean variety television shows
Korean-language television shows
2019 South Korean television series debuts